Ust-Silayka is a rural locality (a settlement) in Yukseyevskoye Rural Settlement, Kochyovsky District, Perm Krai, Russia. The population was 507 as of 2010. There are 7 streets.

Geography 
Ust-Silayka is located 45 km northwest of Kochyovo (the district's administrative centre) by road. Serva is the nearest rural locality.

References 

Rural localities in Kochyovsky District